Three Men in a Tub is a 1938 Our Gang short comedy film directed by Nate Watt. It was the 164th Our Gang short (165th episode, 76th talking short, and 77th talking episode) that was released.

Cast

The Gang
 Darla Hood as Darla
 Eugene Lee as Porky
 George McFarland as Spanky
 Carl Switzer as Alfalfa
 Billie Thomas as Buckwheat

Additional cast
 Darwood Kaye as Waldo
 John Collum as Race starter
 Gary Jasgur as Gary 'Junior'
 Harold Switzer as Kid who falls in the water
 Sheila Brown as Extra
 Audrey Carol as Extra
 Tommy McFarland as Extra
 Jerry Tucker as Extra

See also
 Our Gang filmography

References

External links

1938 films
American black-and-white films
1938 comedy films
1938 short films
Metro-Goldwyn-Mayer short films
Films directed by Nate Watt
Our Gang films
1930s American films
1930s English-language films